Râul Feții may refer to:

 Pârâul Feții, a tributary of the Latorița in Vâlcea County
 Râul Feții (Bistrița)